The Alliance Israélite Universelle (AIU;) is a Paris-based international Jewish organization founded in 1860 with the purpose of safeguarding human rights for Jews around the world. It promotes the ideals of Jewish self-defense and self-sufficiency through education and professional development. The organization is noted for establishing French-language schools for Jewish children throughout the Mediterranean, Iran, and the former Ottoman Empire in the 19th and early-20th centuries.

History

In 1860, Alliance Israelite Universelle embarked on a "mission civilisatrice" to advance the Jews of the Middle East through French education and culture. It was founded by Jules Carvallo, Narcisse Leven (secretary of Adolphe Crémieux), Elie-Aristide Astruc, and Eugène Manuel May 1860 in Paris, and opened its first school in Tetouan, Morocco in 1862. The original members of the society were Jews, and by far the largest number of its members belong to that faith, but the association has enjoyed the sympathy and cooperation of many prominent Christians. As outlined in its prospectus, the program of the society included the emancipation of the Jews from oppressive and discriminating laws, political disabilities, and defense of them in those countries where they were subjected to persecution.

For the attainment of its objectives, the society proposed to carry on a campaign of education through the press and by the publication of works on the history and life of the Jews. In the beginning, however, the course of action adopted by the society for bringing relief to their oppressed brethren in other countries was to secure the intercession of friendly governments in their behalf. Thus, as early as 1867 the governments of France, Italy, Belgium, and the Netherlands made the renewal of existing treaties with Switzerland conditional upon that country's granting full civil and political rights to the Jews. In 1878, representatives of the Alliance laid the condition of the Jews in the Balkan Peninsula before the Congress of Berlin, as a result of which the Treaty of Berlin stipulated that in Romania, Serbia, and Bulgaria no discrimination should be made against any religion in the distribution of civil rights.

Schools

Over time, the activity of the Alliance became more focused on education and especially improving the welfare of Jews. Two years after the first school was opened in Tetuan, an Alliance school opened in Baghdad in 1864. In 1870, Charles Netter, a founding member of Alliance israélite universelle, received a tract of land from the Ottoman Empire as a gift and opened the  Mikveh Israel agricultural school, the first of a network of Jewish schools in Palestine before the establishment of the State of Israel. Over 60 Alliance schools operated in the Ottoman Middle East, Iran and North Africa, providing Jewish children from poor families with formal elementary school and vocational training. Many of the teachers were educated at Alliance teacher training schools in Turkey and France.

The Alliance founded a free school in Jerusalem in 1868. This was followed by Mikveh Israel near Jaffa in 1870. In 1882 a secondary school for boys was established in Jerusalem. Amin al-Husseini was one of their pupils. The original building on Jaffa Road was demolished after 1967. In 1903 the Zionist group Bnei Moshe were to be given a grant to open a school but the funding was withdraw due to Beni Moshe's insistence that lessons should be in Hebrew. The following year the Alliance donated the property which later became Neve Zedak (girls) and Gymnasia Hezliya (boys) schools. In 1906 the Alliance opened a secondary school for girls in Jerusalem.

By 1900, Alliance Israelite Universelle was operating 100 schools with a combined student population of 26,000. Its greatest efforts were concentrated in Morocco, Tunisia and Turkey. French was the third most popular foreign language spoken in Palestine by 1914.  After decades of teaching in French exclusively, the schools began teaching Hebrew to their students after the eleventh Zionist Congress insisted, amidst the modern revival of the Hebrew language, that it be included in the curriculum.

In 1912 the Alliance had 71 schools for boys and 44 for girls, with schools in Baghdad, Jerusalem, Tangier, Istanbul, Beirut, Cairo, Damascus and Salonica. For Jews it was the chief provider of modern education.

A 1930 report found that there were 10 Jewish schools in Baghdad educating 7,182 children. Two of them were run by the Alliance Israélite Universelle. The boys school had originally been the David Sassoon school founded in 1865. Sir Albert Sassoon had given it to the Alliance in 1874. It contained 475 boys. Four languages were taught: Hebrew, Arabic, French and English. There were classes in  the Sciences, Geography and History. All were taught in French except for moral and religious studies which were in Hebrew. The Alliance school for girls was established by Sir Eliezer S. Kadoorie with 1,177 pupils and with a similar syllabus.

As a result of the influence of the French-language schools, Judeo-Spanish language acquired many neologisms from French.

Schools in Israel

Alliance israélite universelle continues to operate dozens of schools and educational programs in Israel today. Historic schools include the Alliance High School in Tel Aviv, Alliance israélite universelle High School in Haifa, René Cassin High School and the Braunshweig Conservative High School in Jerusalem. The network also includes the School for the Deaf in Jerusalem, in which deaf students, Jews and Arabs, with various mental and physical disabilities study together. The Mikve Israel Youth Village operates a state high school, a state-religious high school specializing in life and natural sciences, environmental sciences, and biotechnology; and a French-Israeli high school established in 2007 as a joint initiative of the Israeli and French governments.

Impact on Girls and Women 
The Alliance Israelite Universelle (AIU) changed and shaped the roles and opportunities for women in North Africa. Prior to the establishment of the AIU, primarily girls from wealthy or rabbinical families received an education. Literacy and skilled training provided an opportunity for upward social mobility, especially to Jewish girls of underprivileged backgrounds who could not attain an education previously. Curricula featured foundational mathematics, such as arithmetic, exposure to European subjects such as European geography and the French language. Additionally, girls received vocational training in fields such as needlework, sewing, bookkeeping, secretarial work, laboratory assistance, and industrial chemistry; this training promoted the economic independence of Jewish women in the region. Many North African women were also educated and trained as AIU teachers in France, returning thereafter to their countries of origin in order to teach.

Along with economic change, the AIU changed cultural norms for Jewish girls in the Maghreb as well. Primarily, the AIU lobbied to extend the typical marriage age from twelve to fifteen by 1948. This changing role of women led to controversy regarding the secularization of Jewish society through Western-style education.

The AIU and Secularization 
The AIU, and more generally, the French colonization of swaths of North Africa, shifted education from the hands of rabbis and religious leaders to secular, European instructors. In Algeria, this shift resulted in a legal mandate: in 1845, a law required Jews of Algeria to be registered in French schools, and to only attend a religious schools as a supplement. Although the AIU did teach both secular and religious subjects, such as Hebrew and Biblical History, religious leaders still questioned and bemoaned the secularization.

Similarly, the AIU attempted to secularize the Jewish legal systems in North Africa. Prior to colonization, Jews in Morocco operated their own legal system according to Halacha, Jewish law. In 1913, the AIU appealed to the French government to try the "indigenous [Jewish] inhabitants, in French courts instead of rabbinical tribunals.

Political Influence 
Along with secularization, the AIU used its power to advocate the political assimilation of Maghrebi Jews into French society. AIU instructors were instrumental in the movement of naturalization for educated Moroccan Jews.

Presidents
 Louis-Jean Koenigswarter (1860-1863)
 Adolphe Crémieux (1863-1867)
 Salomon Munk (1867-1867)
 Adolphe Crémieux (1868-1880)
 Salomon Hayum Goldschmidt (1882-1898)
 Narcisse Leven (1898-1915)
 Arnold Netter (1915-1920, interim)
 Sylvain Lévi (1920-1935)
 Arnold Netter (1936-1936)
 Georges Leven (1936-1941)
 René Cassin (1943-1976)
 Jules Braunschvig (1976-1985)
 Adolphe Steg (1985-2011)
 Marc Eisenberg (2011-)

Notable alumni

Din Din Aviv, Israeli pop and folk singer
Gal Mekel (born 1988), Israeli NBA basketball player
Ori Yogev, Israeli businessman

See also
Education in Israel
France-Israel relations
Jews of France

References

Further reading
 Ktziya Aviali-Tevivian, Voyage vers le passé: un nouveau monde est né-le XIXe siècle, Ed. Matah techn, 2003.
 André Chouraqui, L'Alliance israélite universelle et la Renaissance juive contemporaine, 1860-1960, P.U.F., 1965.
 Matia Kam, Mikvé-Israël, Ed. Matah techn. Fonds Avi Haï.
 André Kaspi, Histoire de l'Alliance israélite universelle - De 1860 à nos jours, Ed. Armand Colin, 2010.
 Narcisse Leven, Cinquante ans d'histoire: l'Alliance israélite universelle (1860-1910), Paris, 1911.
 Aharon Rodrigues, Éducation, société et histoire: L'Alliance israélite universelle, Ed. Institut Yad Ben-Zvi, 1991.
 Sciarcon, Jonathan. Educational Oases in the Desert: The Alliance Israélite Universelle's Girls' Schools in Ottoman Iraq, 1895-1915. Albany State Univ of New York Press (SUNY), 2017. 196 pp. .

External links 
  
 History of Alliance Israelite Universelle

Jewish French history
Jewish Syrian history
Zionism in France
Zionist organizations
Jewish educational organizations
Education in Israel
1860 establishments in France
Educational institutions established in 1860
Educational organizations based in France
Human rights organizations based in France
Secular Jewish culture in France
Jewish Moroccan history
Jewish Tunisian history
Jewish Turkish history
Education in Morocco
Jewish Algerian history
Education in Tunisia
Education in Turkey
Education in Algeria